Sagittaria latifolia is a plant found in shallow wetlands and is sometimes known as broadleaf arrowhead, duck-potato, Indian potato, katniss, or wapato. This plant produces edible tubers that have traditionally been extensively used by Native Americans.

Description
The plant produces rosettes of leaves and an inflorescence on a long rigid scape. Spongy and solid, the leaves have parallel venation meeting in the middle and the extremities. The flowers have three round, white petals and three very short curved, dark green sepals. Flower sex is easy to determine due to the dissimilarity between the 25 to 50 yellow stamens of the male and the sphere of green carpels of the female ones.

Distribution and habitat
Sagittaria latifolia is native to southern Canada and most of the contiguous United States, as well as Mexico, Central America, Colombia, Venezuela, Ecuador, and Cuba. It is also naturalized in Hawaii, Puerto Rico, Bhutan, Australia and much of Europe (France, Spain, Italy, Romania, Germany, Switzerland, the Czech Republic, and European Russia). In Mexico, it is reported from Campeche, Nayarit, Tabasco, Tamaulipas, Puebla, Jalisco, Durango, Tlaxcala, Estado de México, Veracruz and Michoacán.

It can be found in wet areas such as ponds and swamps.

Ecology
Extremely frequent as an emergent plant, broadleaf arrowhead forms dense colonies on very wet soils that become more open as the species mixes with other species of deeper water levels. These colonies form long bands following the curves of rivers, ponds and lakes, well-marked by the dark green color of the leaves. The plant has strong roots and can survive through wide variations of the water level, slow currents and waves. It displays an affinity for high levels of phosphates and hard waters.

Despite the name "duck potato", ducks rarely consume the tubers, which are usually buried too deep for them to reach, although they often eat the seeds. Beavers, North American Porcupines, and muskrats eat the whole plant, tubers included. Native Americans are alleged to have opened muskrat houses to obtain their collection of roots.

This plant is vulnerable to aphids and spider mites.

Cultivation
Fertilize with decomposed manure. They can be multiplied through seeding or division in July. The starchy tubers, produced by rhizomes beneath the wet ground surface, have long been an important food source to the indigenous peoples of the Americas, along with those of S. cuneata. The tubers can be detached from the ground in various ways: with the feet, a pitchfork, or a stick, and after digging up, the tubers usually float to the surface. Ripe tubers can be collected in the autumn, and are also often found then floating freely.

Uses 
The starchy tubers were consumed by Native Americans in the lower Columbia River basin, in addition to the Omaha and Cherokee nations. The tubers can be eaten raw or cooked for 15 to 20 minutes. The taste is similar to potatoes and chestnuts, and they can be prepared in the same fashions: roasting, frying, boiling, and so on. They can also be sliced and dried to prepare a flour.

Other edible parts include late summer buds and fruits.

Culture
The name of Shubenacadie, a community located in central Nova Scotia, Canada, means "abounding in ground nuts" (i.e., broadleaf arrowhead) in the Mi'kmaq language.

References

Further reading

External links
 
 
 Coeur d'Alene Tribe’s annual Water Potato Days Festival video
 Water Potato Day , Coeur d'Alene Tribe

latifolia
Flora of the United States
Flora of Canada
Flora of Europe
Flora of Hawaii
Flora of Puerto Rico
Flora of Mexico
Flora of Cuba
Flora of Central America
Flora of Colombia
Flora of Ecuador
Flora of Venezuela
Flora of Campeche
Flora of Nayarit
Flora of Tabasco
Flora of Tamaulipas
Flora of Puebla
Flora of Jalisco
Flora of Durango
Flora of Tlaxcala
Flora of Veracruz
Flora of Michoacán
Flora of Bhutan
Flora without expected TNC conservation status
Freshwater plants
Plants described in 1805
Root vegetables